Guasdualito Airport , also known as Vare Maria Airport, is an airport serving Guasdualito in the Apure state of Venezuela.

The Guasdualito non-directional beacon (Ident: GTO) is located on the field.

See also
Transport in Venezuela
List of airports in Venezuela

References

External links
OurAirports - Guasdualito
SkyVector - Guasdualito
OpenStreetMap - Guasdualito

Airports in Venezuela
Buildings and structures in Apure
Guasdualito